Al-Ahly (Benghazi) is a Libyan basketball club that is based in Benghazi, Libya. The club competes in the Libyan Division I Basketball League.

History
In 2012, they won the Arab Club Basketball Championship, by defeating JS Kairouan of the Tunisia in the final.

They finished third in the 2008–09 Libyan League season.

Honours
Libyan Basketball League
Winners (2): 2009–10, 2010–11

In African competitions
FIBA Africa Clubs Champions Cup  (3 appearances)
2010 – Group Stage
2011 – Group Stage
2013 – 8th Place

References

Basketball teams in Libya
Sport in Benghazi